Dharam Singh Uppal (born 21 July 1959) is a former Indian international track and field athlete and presently a Superintendent of Police in Punjab. He was in the field  event of men's 800 m and 1500 m race and won several medals for the country as well as state. He represented India in Asian games and SAF games. Due to a major accident, he could not carry on with his sports and joined Punjab Police. He had been posted as a DSP (Deputy Superintendent of Police) in Bathinda, Jalandhar, Hoshiarpur, Kapurthala districts of Punjab. He hails from Amritsar in Punjab but residing in Jalandhar district. 

Uppal was also awarded with the President Gallantry Police Medal for his achievements.

References 

1959 births
2013 deaths
Indian police officers
Indian Sikhs
People from Punjab, India
Punjabi people
Indian male middle-distance runners
Athletes from Amritsar
Asian Games competitors for India